The Zbruch is a river in Western Ukraine, a left tributary of the Dniester.

It flows within the Podolian Upland starting from the Avratinian Upland. Zbruch is the namesake of the Zbruch idol, a sculpture of a Slavic deity (9th century) in the form of a column with a head with four faces, discovered in 1848 by the river. From 1851 the statue is kept in the Archaeological Museum of Kraków, however its copies are available in the Moscow Historical Museum, the Ternopil Regional Museum, and the Pochaiv Museum of Atheism. Scientist consider that the idol an interpretation of the ancient Slavic of god Sviatovit sacked upon the baptizing of the local population.

Upon the river are situated a couple of small Hydro Electric Stations (Bodnariv's and Martynkiv's), while along the river are some 140 ponds. The river serves as a natural border between Ternopil and Khmelnytskyi regions. As it was mentioned above, the river flows through the Podolia Upland sneaking past the Podolian hills also known as Medobory for their honey-bearing flora (literally: Med - honey and Bory - forests). Along the river, there are recreational areas for swimming in the water. Medobory stretches from the northeastern part of the Lviv Region to the northern borders of the Republic of Moldova. The source of the river lies in relative proximity to other rivers such as the Horyn and the Sluch and used to serve as an alternative route for the tradeway "From the Varangians to Greeks". Presumably the earliest name for the river was Boruch.

The Zbruch had international significance following the first partition of Poland when between 1772 and 1793 the river was a border between Poland-Lithuania and Habsburg monarchy. After the second partition of Poland in 1793–1807 and 1815–1918 the river was a border between the Austrian Galicia on one side and Imperial Russia on the other. During that time the river was also called Pidhirtsi. Following the Polish-Ukrainian Alliance of 1920 it was intended as the border between Poland and Ukraine. After the Treaty of Riga the Polish-Soviet border was established in the area, running along the river (this situation lasted until 1939).

Charles de Gaulle, who served with the staff of the French Military Mission to Poland as an instructor of Poland's infantry during the Polish-Soviet War (1919–1921), distinguished himself in operations near the Zbrucz, where he held the rank of major in the Polish army, and won Poland's highest military decoration, the Virtuti Militari.
Sites along the river
 Medobory Nature Preserve (near towns of Husyatyn and Hrymailiv)
 National Nature Park "Podilski Tovtry"
 Monochynsk Zakaznik
 Kudryntsi Castle
 Chornokozyntsi Castle
 crossing between the towns of Pidvolochysk and Volochysk, forming historically a major border checkpoint between the Austrian crown and the Russian Empire
 town of Husiatyn, a site of Zbruch idol discovery
 Skala-Podilska Castle and park (a state architectural monument)

Characteristics

It is 247 km in length and its drainage basin is 3,330 km2. The average depth is 1.5–2 m. The width of the river is 8–11 m, the depth of the plains is 2.5–4 m. The channel has numerous meanders, there are borderlines, many islands and elders. The slope of the river is 0.8 m / km, the cross-sectional area is 22 m ², the flow rate is 0.57 m / s, the water flow is 15.54 m³ / sec.

Main tributaries
Samchyk, Samets', Hnyla, Vilkhovyi Potik (right)
Hrabarka, Bovvanets', Shandrova, Potik Kizya (left)

Geomorphology
In the upper reaches of the valley is small, its slopes are flattened, plowed. In the middle reaches, the valley is V-shaped (canyon-shaped), width 0.5-1.6 km, slopes steep, dissected by ravines and beams. Floodplain up to 80–100 m, sometimes absent, in the upper reaches up to 1-1,2 km, swampy; Belts narrow down to 80–120 m or less.

References

External links 
 Zbrucz in the Geographical Dictionary of the Kingdom of Poland (1895)
 Kundys,M. Zbruch - a river of unity. "Nove zhyttya". June 10, 1989 (website of "Podilski Tovtry" National Park

 
Rivers of Ternopil Oblast
Rivers of Khmelnytskyi Oblast
Poland–Soviet Union border
Austrian Empire–Russian Empire border
Austrian Empire–Polish–Lithuanian Commonwealth border